Louis Andrew Grammatico (born 2 May 1950), known professionally as Lou Gramm, is an American singer-songwriter, best known as the lead singer of the rock band Foreigner from 1977 to 1990 and again from 1992 to 2003, during which time the band had numerous successful albums and singles.

Early life
Gramm was born on 2 May 1950, in Rochester, New York, the son of Nikki (born Masetta), a singer, and Bennie Grammatico, a band leader and trumpeter. He attended Gates-Chili High School in Rochester, graduating with the class of 1968, and majored in education and art at Monroe Community College.

Music career

1970s
Gramm became front man for the band Black Sheep. Black Sheep was the first American band signed to the Chrysalis label, which released their first single, "Stick Around" (1974). Soon after this initial bit of success, Black Sheep signed with Capitol Records, releasing two albums in succession: Black Sheep (1975) and Encouraging Words (late 1975). They were the opening act for Kiss when an accident with their equipment truck on the ice-covered New York State Thruway suddenly ended the band's tour on Christmas Eve, 1975. Unable to support its albums with live performances, Black Sheep disbanded.

A year earlier, Gramm met his future bandmate Mick Jones. Jones was in Rochester performing with the band Spooky Tooth, and Gramm had given Jones a copy of Black Sheep's first album (S/T). It was early in 1976, not long after Black Sheep's truck accident, when Jones, in search of a lead singer for a new band he was assembling, expressed his interest in Gramm and invited him to audition.

Gramm traveled to New York to audition and got the job. Lou Grammatico then became Lou Gramm. The band, which was initially known as "Trigger," was later renamed Foreigner. With Foreigner, Gramm became one of the most successful rock vocalists of the late 1970s and 1980s.

1980s
Foreigner's first eight singles cracked the Billboard Top 20, making them the first band since The Beatles to achieve this milestone. Gramm performed vocals on all of Foreigner's hits including "Urgent", "Juke Box Hero", "Break It Up", "Say You Will", and "I Don't Want to Live Without You". He co-wrote most of the band's songs, including the hit ballads "Waiting for a Girl Like You", which spent ten weeks at #2 on the 1981/82 American Hot 100, and "I Want to Know What Love Is", which was a number one hit in eight countries.

Gramm and Jones had a volatile chemistry. Gramm wanted the band to remain true to its purer rock origins, favoring music with a solid drum and guitar structure, whereas Jones embraced the 1980s style of synthesizer ballads. Gramm has called the 4 album (1981) the high point of his work with Foreigner. Foreigner's next album, Agent Provocateur (1984), took three years to release due to the ongoing creative differences between Jones and Gramm. The band released Inside Information in 1987.

Gramm released his first solo album, Ready or Not, in January 1987 to critical acclaim. The single "Midnight Blue" reached the top five.

Also in 1987, Gramm contributed the song "Lost in the Shadows" to the soundtrack for the comedy horror film The Lost Boys.

A second solo effort, Long Hard Look (October 1989), that included the top ten hit "Just Between You and Me" as well as "True Blue Love", reached the Top 40. The album also included "Hangin' on My Hip", which was featured in the 1990 film Navy SEALs.

1990s
Gramm announced his departure from Foreigner in May 1990 due to differences with Jones, and to focus on his solo career.

Gramm also formed Shadow King with close friend and former Black Sheep bassist Bruce Turgon; their 1991 self-titled album was released by Atlantic Records. Despite positive reviews, the group did not enjoy the level of marketing and promotional support necessary to sustain a new project and soon disbanded. Also in 1991, Gramm contributed the song "One Dream" to the movie Highlander II: The Quickening.

Gramm rejoined Foreigner in May 1992 after working out his differences with Jones during the Los Angeles riots. In 1995, Foreigner released the album Mr. Moonlight on the Rhythm Safari label which, although relatively successful in Europe, was not as widely marketed or distributed in the U.S. Still, "Until the End of Time" made inroads at adult contemporary radio, peaking at number 8.

In 1996, Jones invited Gramm to perform backing vocals on a cover version of "I Want to Know What Love Is" he was producing for the Australian singer Tina Arena. The song went on to become a major hit again throughout Europe.

In 1997, Gramm provided vocals for Christian rock band Petra's album entitled Petra Praise 2: We Need Jesus.

In April 1997, on the eve of a Japan tour, Gramm was diagnosed with a benign brain tumor and underwent surgery. He continued to work with Jones throughout his illness. By 1998, Gramm was back touring with Foreigner.

2000s to present
In early 2003, Gramm once again departed from Foreigner.

The Lou Gramm Band released a Christian rock album in 2009.

In May 2013, Lou released his autobiography Juke Box Hero - My five decades in rock 'n' Roll.

Gramm was inducted to the Songwriters Hall of Fame on 13 June 2013. On 20 July 2017, Gramm joined Foreigner for three songs during an encore at Jones Beach Theatre in Long Island, New York. On 29 December 2018, Gramm announced on stage in Schenectady, New York that he was retiring from touring. However, he stated that he would continue to release studio music and perform occasional live shows including The Lopen, a celebrity concert produced by Howard Perl Entertainment to benefit children at Akron Children's Hospital.

In 2019, Gramm toured on a bill with Asia Featuring John Payne, where they also acted as his back-up group. Gramm performed lead vocals on the track "Sometimes" on the 2019 album The Secret by Alan Parsons.

Gramm told RockBandReviews.com in 2019 that he was planning to release some new solo material later that year. "I'm working on some things now that were extra songs on my solo albums," he said. "If there's 10 songs on the album, you usually record 13 and pick the best 10, or the 10 that are finished. So the other three have been siting around for 25, 30 years, and I went back recently and listened to them, and they sounded so good that I finished them. Starting in about two months, maybe three months, I'm gonna be releasing three songs on downloads and see how that works out. So those songs will be heard for the first time. And then in another three or four months, there's gonna be three more new songs released. So that could be going on for six or eight months, and we'll see what happens."

Gramm also said that he is "thinking about" releasing a greatest-hits package of his non-Foreigner works.

Personal life
In 1992, Gramm, after having completed a stint in drug rehabilitation, became a born again Christian.

In April 1997, Gramm was diagnosed with a type of brain tumor called a craniopharyngioma. Although the tumor was benign, the resulting surgery damaged his pituitary gland. In addition, the recovery program had caused Gramm to gain weight, and likewise affected his stamina and voice.

Along with his love for music, he developed an affinity for fast cars. In Rochester in the late 1960s and early '70s, Gramm remembers, it wasn't difficult to find a summer night drag race. Gramm's vehicle of choice: A Chevy Nova 396, 375-horsepower, factory-printed.

As of 2017, Gramm is married to Robyn Grammatico. They have a daughter. He also has four children from previous marriages.

Discography

Solo albums

Solo singles

With Black Sheep
1974: Stick Around / Cruisin' (For Your Love) – 45 single
1975: Broken Promises – 45 single 
1975: Black Sheep
1975: Encouraging Words

With Foreigner

With Poor Heart
1988: Foreigner in a Strange Land
1993: The Best of the Early Years
(Note: These are actually releases of much older recordings)

With Shadow King
1991: Shadow King

With Liberty N' Justice
2004: Welcome to the Revolution

Lou Gramm Band/The Voice of Foreigner Band members
 Lou Gramm – lead vocals, percussion (2003–present)
 Ben Gramm – drums (2003–2016, 2018)
 AD Zimmer – bass guitar, backing vocals (2010–2018)
 Michael Staertow – lead guitar, backing vocals (2012–2018)
 Scott Gilman – saxophone, rhythm guitar, backing vocals (2016–2018)
 Jeff Jacobs – keyboards, backing vocals (2017–2018)

Timeline

References

External links

 

1950 births
Living people
American performers of Christian music
American male singer-songwriters
American rock singers
American hard rock musicians
American rock songwriters
Black Sheep (rock band) members
Foreigner (band) members
American people of Italian descent
Musicians from Rochester, New York
Shadow King members
Singer-songwriters from New York (state)
Atlantic Records artists